Sanjiang (三江) is a town in Xupu County, Hunan, China. , it had 23 villages under its administration.

It was formed in 2015 by combining the administrative areas of Gangdong Township, Liangjiang Township, and Shanxi Township.

References

Towns of Huaihua
Xupu